Muḥammad ibn al-Muʿtaṣim was an Abbasid prince, the son of Caliph al-Mu'tasim. He was a contemporary of the caliph al-Wathiq and al-Mutawakkil. His son Ahmad became the twelfth Abbasid caliph as al-Musta'in. Muhammad was the first prince in the Abbasid history whose son became a caliph, no other Abbasid prince before him had this prestige.

Background
Muhammad was the son of Abū Isḥaq Muhammad. He was the member of influential  Abbasid house that was ruling the Caliphate since 750. His full name was Muhammad ibn Muhammad ibn Harun al-Rashid and his Kunya was Abu Ahmad.
His father, al-Mu'tasim's parents were the fifth Abbasīd caliph, Harun al-Rashid, and Marida bint Shabib, concubine. Muhammad was born during his uncle's reign.

His uncle, al-Ma'mun had made no official provisions for his succession. Al-Ma'mun's son, al-Abbas was old enough to rule and had acquired experience of command in the border wars with the Byzantines, but had not been named heir. According to the account of al-Tabari, on his deathbed al-Ma'mun dictated a letter nominating his brother, rather than al-Abbas, as his successor, and Abu Ishaq was acclaimed as caliph on 9August, with the regnal title of al-Mu'tasim (in full al-Muʿtaṣim bi’llāh, "he who seeks refuge in God"). His father became the eighth Abbasid caliph of the Caliphate.

Biography

Muhammad was the son of caliph al-Mu'tasim (r. 833–842) from one of his concubine (Umm walad). He spend his childhood in Baghdad. As an Abbasid prince he received a good education along with his other brothers. When his father became Caliph, the wealth of Muhammad and his brothers increased. In 836 his father founded new city Samarra and moved the capital of the Caliphate to there, Muhammad also moved to Samarra. His father ruled the Empire for almost eight years until his death. His elder brother Al-Wathiq became caliph after his father's death on 5 January 842. He ascended smoothly to the throne without any opposition by his brothers including Muhammad. Six years later, al-Wathiq died as the result of dropsy, while being seated in an oven in an attempt to cure it, on 10 August 847. Muhammad was a courtier and a patron of scholars during his reign. He was succeeded by al-Mutawakkil.
The life of Muhammad under him is obscure, as he played no important role in political affairs.

His brother, Al-Mutawakkil saw Muhammad as a potential successor (future caliph) because of his popularity to prevent Muhammad from succession, His brother caliph al-Mutawakkil (r. 847-861) had created a plan of succession that would allow his sons to inherit the caliphate after his death; he would be succeeded first by his eldest son, al-Muntasir, then by al-Mu'tazz and third by al-Mu'ayyad. This nomination of his three sons as heir prevent all his brothers from succession especially Muhammad and Ahmad.

Muhammad ibn al-Mu'tasim had several children from different concubines, one of them was Ahmad. Ahmad (future al-Musta'in) was born in 836 to a concubine from Sicily called Makhariq also known as Umm Ahmad. Muhammad died during the reign of his brother al-Mutawakkil. Even though he was sidelined from succession, his popularity didn't die. His son became caliph in mid 862.

Contribution to accession of al-Musta'in to Caliphate
Just few years after death of Muhammad. In December 861 al-Mutawakkil was assassinated by a group of Turkic military officers, likely with the support of al-Muntasir. During al-Muntasir's short reign (r. 861-862), the Turks pressured him into removing al-Mu'tazz and al-Mu'ayyad from the succession. When al-Muntasir died, the Turkic officers gathered together and decided to install the dead caliph's cousin al-Musta'in on the throne. Muhammad's connection with  Caliphal court, his relation with al-Wathiq and his popularity among officers of Turkic regiment became his major contribution to Al-Musta'in's career.

See also
 Al-Qasim ibn Harun al-Rashid
 Amir al-hajj

References

Sources
 
 
 
 
 

Arab Muslims
9th-century births
9th-century deaths
Sons of Abbasid caliphs
9th-century people from the Abbasid Caliphate
9th-century Arabs